Palpita horocrates is a moth in the family Crambidae. It is found in the Democratic Republic of Congo (West Kasai).

References

Moths described in 1937
Palpita
Moths of Africa